Stephen Charles Hollings (born 23 November 1946) is a male retired British middle-distance runner.

Athletics career
Hollings competed in the men's 3000 metres steeplechase at the 1972 Summer Olympics. He represented England in the 3,000 metres steeplechase event, at the 1974 British Commonwealth Games in Christchurch, New Zealand.

References

1946 births
Living people
Athletes (track and field) at the 1972 Summer Olympics
Athletes (track and field) at the 1974 British Commonwealth Games
British male middle-distance runners
British male steeplechase runners
Olympic athletes of Great Britain
Commonwealth Games competitors for England